Pablo Fernando Hernández Roetti (born 5 May 1975 in Montevideo) is a retired Uruguayan association footballer.

He was signed for Venezia on 22 July 2003.

Honours
Mexican champions: Invierno 1999

References

External links
Profile at Tenfield
Puebla FC profile

1975 births
Living people
Uruguayan footballers
Uruguayan expatriate footballers
Uruguay international footballers
Expatriate footballers in Italy
Expatriate footballers in Mexico
Expatriate footballers in Brazil
Defensor Sporting players
Tigres UANL footballers
C.F. Pachuca players
Grêmio Foot-Ball Porto Alegrense players
Venezia F.C. players
C.A. Bella Vista players
Uruguayan Primera División players
Liga MX players
1997 Copa América players
1997 FIFA Confederations Cup players
Footballers from Montevideo
Association football defenders